Bicaz is a commune in Maramureș County, Crișana, Romania. It is composed of three villages: Bicaz, Ciuta (Szilágynyires) and Corni (Somfalu).

Sights 
 Wooden Church in Bicaz, built in the 18th century (1723), historic monument

External links 
 Bicaz commune, Maramureș County

References

Communes in Maramureș County
Localities in Crișana